Christopher Michael Dawson (born 26 July 1948) is an Australian convicted murderer and former professional rugby league footballer who played in the 1970s.

Following the 1982 disappearance of his wife, Lynette, and two separate coronial inquests, the NSW Coroner determined that Lynette Dawson was dead and that her most likely murderer was her husband, Chris. After many years of stalled and failed investigations, Dawson was arrested and charged with murder in December 2018. His trial started on 9 May 2022 in the NSW Supreme Court. In 2022, Dawson was found guilty of murdering Lynette, and was sentenced to 24 years in prison.

Early life
Dawson was born in Sydney, New South Wales. He is the second born of twins; his twin brother is Paul and he has an older brother, Peter. Dawson attended Sydney Boys High School where he was a prefect. He graduated in 1966.

Dawson met Lynette Simms at a high school function in 1965, when they were both aged sixteen. They married in 1970 at St Jude's Church, Randwick, and later had two children.

Rugby career 
Both Chris and Paul played rugby union for Eastern Suburbs.

The Dawson brothers switched codes to play rugby league for the Newtown Jets in 1972. Chris Dawson played in the second row along with Paul for the Newtown Jets club for five seasons. The Dawson brothers were part of the 1973 New South Wales Rugby League Club Championship winning team.

Subsequent career 
After their rugby careers finished, both Chris and Paul Dawson became physical education teachers at public high schools on the Northern Beaches and North Shore of Sydney. Dawson was teaching at Cromer High School in 1981 when he commenced a sexual relationship with a 16-year-old pupil, Joanne Curtis, while he was married to Lynette Dawson.

The Dawson brothers and families moved to Queensland in 1985. Chris Dawson worked at Keebra Park State High School first then later moved to Coombabah State High School to work with his brother Paul.

In 2003 Dawson was working at St Ursula's College in Yeppoon, Queensland.

Wife's murder

Dawson's wife Lynette went missing in January 1982. Two days after Lynette's disappearance, Dawson invited Joanne Curtis to move into the family house. He reported his wife missing on 18 February 1982, six weeks after her disappearance, claiming she had left after marital problems and had joined a commune. He finalised divorce proceedings against Lynette in 1983.

Dawson married Joanne Curtis in 1984. The couple divorced in 1993.

Lynette's body has never been found but two coronial inquests were conducted in 2001 and 2003 with both ruling that Lynette Dawson must be dead and was most likely murdered by a known person.

Dawson was the main subject of an investigative podcast series, The Teacher's Pet, by journalist Hedley Thomas. Thomas investigated allegations about the disappearance of Lynette and brought Dawson into renewed public and media focus through the podcast's broadcast in 2018. , the Gold Walkley-award winning podcast was downloaded 28 million times. The series was temporarily removed from download in Australia in April 2019, "to help ensure that Chris Dawson gets a fair trial".

On 5 December 2018, Dawson was arrested by detectives from Queensland Police for the murder of Lynette Dawson. He was extradited to New South Wales on 6 December 2018 to face trial. In his appearance at Sydney's Central Local Court that day, he was refused bail and was remanded in custody. On 17 December 2018, Dawson was granted bail and his family paid A$1.5 million bail for him to be released. Appearing in the NSW Local Court in June 2019, Dawson pleaded not guilty to the murder of Lynette Dawson. In February 2020, Dawson was committed to stand trial for the murder of Lynette. His arraignment was set for April, with a potential trial date later in 2020.

On August 30, 2022, Dawson was found guilty of murdering Lynette in 1982, after a judge only trial in the Supreme Court of New South Wales.

On December 2, 2022, Dawson was sentenced to 24 years in jail, with a non-parole period of 18 years, for the murder of Lynette.

References

1948 births
Living people
Australian rugby league players
Newtown Jets players
New South Wales rugby league team players
Rugby league players from Sydney
Rugby league second-rows
Rugby league props
Australian murderers
Australian people convicted of murder
People convicted of murder by New South Wales